Hathaway Pond is a small lake located west-southwest of the hamlet of Rock Rift in Delaware County, New York. Hathaway Pond drains south via an unnamed creek that flows into Sands Creek. Russell Lake is located west of Hathaway Pond.

See also
 List of lakes in New York

References 

Lakes of New York (state)
Lakes of Delaware County, New York